Fabienne Reuteler (born 2 September 1979) is a Swiss snowboarder and Olympic medalist. She received a bronze medal at the 2002 Winter Olympics in Salt Lake City.

References

External links
 http://www.fabiennereuteler.com

1979 births
Living people
Swiss female snowboarders
Olympic snowboarders of Switzerland
Snowboarders at the 2002 Winter Olympics
Olympic bronze medalists for Switzerland
Olympic medalists in snowboarding
Medalists at the 2002 Winter Olympics
21st-century Swiss women